Stenostola minamii is a species of beetle in the family Cerambycidae. It was described by Hiroshi Makihara in 1984, originally under the genus Eumecocera.

References

Saperdini
Beetles described in 1984